The Ballard Estate business district is situated in the financial district of Fort. Located between Chhatrapati Shivaji Maharaj Terminus and Fort in South Mumbai, it hosts the offices of shipping companies and the headquarters of the Mumbai Port Trust at the Port House. It has the Reliance Centre, many mid-priced hotels and a noted Irani cafe, Britannia.

Overview
The Bombay Port Trust reclaimed  of land at Ballard Estate between 1914 and 1918, using material excavated from the Alexandra Docks for filling.  Ballard Estate was named for Colonel J. A. Ballard, a founder of Mumbai Port Trust, which constructed the port and Ballard Pier.  George Wittet designed the buildings for the business district, imposing a uniformity of style and design through the use of European Renaissance facades.  As it is built in the  Edwardian neoclassical architecture, it has a "London feel" to it and is often referred to as "London-like" by the locals.  

A plan to relieve congestion, conserve the structures and enliven the historic area under the auspices of the Heritage Conservation Committee has been proposed.

Images

References

External links

Neighbourhoods in Mumbai
Edwardian architecture